LSD is a supergroup consisting of British musician and rapper Labrinth, Australian singer-songwriter Sia and American music producer Diplo. The ensemble has released six singles (one of them a remix of their song "Genius"), all of which appear on their self-titled debut album, released on 12 April 2019.

History
On 11 March 2018, Diplo posted, to Instagram, a photo of a cassette tape with the letters "LSD" marked on it; in the caption, he tagged Sia and Labrinth. On 3 May 2018, LSD released their debut single, "Genius", along with an animated music video. The following day, Diplo revealed that LSD was formed when he was invited to write a song with Labrinth and Sia. Diplo said: "Originally, I wasn't in [LSD] and then our publisher had the idea to throw me in there; those two artists, together, are two of the craziest, most creative people I ever met in my life. I think they have the most severe attention deficit disorder together, their ideas are so crazy, so I helped put their ideas together, taking the job of their producer."

On 10 May, they debuted the song "Audio", as well as its music video. On 6 August, Sia teased the release of a new track titled "Thunderclouds", which was released three days later, on 9 August. LSD released the song "Mountains" on 1 November 2018. Talking to Rolling Stone in November 2018, Sia revealed that the group would release an album. The album, Labrinth, Sia & Diplo Present... LSD, was released on 12 April 2019 through Columbia Records.

In October 2020, Diplo stated via Twitter that LSD hoped to return for a new project.

The group name is a clear reference to the hallucinogenic drug LSD.

Discography

Studio albums

Singles

Other charted songs

Music videos

Notes

References

External links
 
 

 
Columbia Records artists
Diplo
Electronic music supergroups
Musical collectives
Musical groups established in 2018
Musical trios
Pop music supergroups
Power pop groups
Psychedelic pop music groups
Sia (musician)
Syco Music artists